The Rinns of Islay (Scottish Gaelic: Na Roinn Ìleach; alternative English spelling Rhinns of Islay) is an area on the west of the island of Islay in the Inner Hebrides of Scotland.

It is a peninsula that is attached to the main body of the island by a narrow isthmus towards its northern end. The main population centres are Port Charlotte and Portnahaven, based on the A847 that runs along its eastern coast.

It is designated a Special Protection Area due to its importance for a number of breeding and wintering birds, particularly Greenland white-fronted goose and chough. The significance of the area owes much to its wide variety of habitats including bog, moorland, dune grassland, maritime grassland, marsh and extensively-farmed agricultural land.

The Rinns of Islay lighthouse is located on the island of Orsay.

The Rhinns complex, a deformed igneous complex that is considered to form the basement to the Colonsay Group of metasedimentary rocks takes its name from the Rhinns of Islay.

See also

 List of lighthouses in Scotland
 List of Northern Lighthouse Board lighthouses

References

External links

Special Protection Area designation
 Northern Lighthouse Board 

Landforms of Islay
Special Protection Areas in Scotland
Ramsar sites in Scotland
Sites of Special Scientific Interest in Islay and Jura
Special Areas of Conservation in Scotland
Geological type localities of Scotland
Peninsulas of Scotland
Works of Robert Stevenson (civil engineer)